Salvador (meaning "saviour" in Catalan, Spanish, and Portuguese) is normally an indirect way of naming a Messiah.

People with the given name
 Salvador Allende (1908−1973), deposed president of Chile
 Salvador Bacarisse (1898−1963), Spanish composer
 Salva Ballesta (born 1975), Spanish footballer
 Salvador Dalí (1904−1989), Spanish surrealist painter
 Salvador Espriu (1913−1985), Spanish poet
 Salvador Fidalgo (1756−1803), Spanish explorer
Salvador Franco (died 3 January 2021), Venezuelan detainee
 Salvador Gómez (water polo) (born 1968), Spanish water polo player
 Salvador Gonzáles Escalona (born 1948), Cuban artist
 Salvador González Marco (born 1963), Spanish footballer
 Salvador "Doy" Laurel (1928−2004), Filipino politician
 Salvador Luria (1912−1991), Italian-American scientist
 Salvador de Madariaga (1886−1978), Spanish writer
 Salvador Medialdea (born 1951), Filipino lawyer, business executive, and government administrator
 Salvador Novo (1904−1974), Mexican writer
 Salvador Panelo (fl. 1970s–2010s), Filipino politician
 Salvador Pineda (born 1952), Mexican actor
 Salvador Puig Antich (1948−1974), Spanish anarchist executed by garrote under the Francoist State
Salvador Ramos (2004-2022), American mass shooter who was the perpetrator of the Robb Elementary School shooting
 Salvador Sánchez (1959−1982), Mexican boxer
 Salvador Sobral (born 1989), Portuguese Eurovision winner. 
Salvador Volpati, Portuguese footballer

People with the surname
 António Salvador (athlete) (born 1966), Portuguese long-distance runner
Alexya Salvador (born 1980), Brazilian reverend and teacher
 Bryce Salvador (born 1976), Canadian professional ice hockey defenceman
 Francis Salvador (1747−1776), Jewish-American patriot
 Gregorio Salvador Caja (born 1927), Spanish linguist
 Henri Salvador (1917−2008), French singer and jazz guitarist
 Herman "Isko" Salvador (born 1958), Filipino actor and comedian, also known as Brod Pete
 Janella Salvador (born 1998), Filipina actress
 Jordi Salvador (born 1964), Spanish politician
 Jorge Salvador Lara (1926−2012), Ecuadorian Foreign Minister, diplomat, columnist, writer, and historian.
 Joseph Salvador (1716−1786), head of the British East India Company, leader of the Sephardic community in Great Britain, and great-grandfather of Francis Salvador
 Lou Salvador (1905−1973), Filipino basketball player
 Maja Salvador (born 1988), Filipina actress
 Phillip Salvador (born 1953), Filipino actor
 Rosauro Reyes Salvador, better known as Ross Rival (1945−2007), Filipino actor
 Tod Rex Salvador (also known as Tripp Eisen), ex-guitarist of Murderdolls, Dope and Static-X

See also
 Salvador (disambiguation)
 Salvatore (name)
 Salvatore (disambiguation)

References

Spanish-language surnames
Spanish masculine given names
Catalan-language surnames
Catalan masculine given names
Portuguese-language surnames